Articuli Podmanickyani is a document issued by the bishop of Nitra, and Zagreb, advisor of King Vladislaus II and landlord of Považský hrad (Hungarian: Vágbeszterce vára) János Podmanitzky. The document officially states the relationship between landlords and subjects in the town of Považská Bystrica. While establishing ‘’new’’ orders, the document indirectly shows conditions of customary life as observed by Articuli. Another important feature of the document is that shortly afterwards János Podmanitzky published it in Latin, he also translated it to Slovak, which was a relatively rare occurrence at that time.

Document 

It is appointed that all the arable lands of the town should be divided into 52 povrazec (Latin: funis, medieval measure unit, it equals roughly 30 m, in modern square measures such a piece of land would have an area of 15-30 ha), and not more. In the town there should be 52 houses lived by more august commons, among those 52 povrazec of land should be divided. The row of these houses permitted to own land started from the house of blacksmith Pavol Masak, on Hlinik Street, at that time. From the opposite site of the brook Bystrica (Vágbeszterce), it was bounded by Petrik's house. Then it continued on the other side from merchant Baltazar's, which was near the street, and which led to haj nearby forest embanked Skala's house, then it curved around back up to the river.  The next segment of land was between Kral's and Uhlik's house.  That was it 52 houses with surrounding lands, to each one povrazec was assigned.  The landlord cannot in any case take land belonging to these houses. If anyone is willing to sell his house, among the residents of these houses, the house must be sold with the land and for a suitable price. If the seller of the house and the buyer cannot agree on the price, the mayor or town's assembly should decide the price.
The mayor and burgesses should be elected by votes from these 52 houses.
Because in the past tax was paid by the 52 houses (povrazov), from now on it will be paid from 52 houses.
There will be a mayor and burgesses who will govern the community with their own conscience and beliefs, and not the community who will govern them.
In the event that anyone wants to build a house, either from those 52 houses, or from those settle on lands, those owning the land should bring those who want to build suitable wood for construction, and those living in gardens should for it help with building. Building should be allowed to everyone.
No one else from those 52 have the right to pull beer and sell wine. There is only one winery, with the exception of the annual market. The right to sell wine is passed from one to another. If anyone wants to start selling wine, the mayor with assembly should be called, so that they can decide on the product's price, and everyone who will sell the product will save quarter zlaty (medieval currency in that time) for the town's budget. If there is anyone poor, who cannot sell wine, his annual right might be sold for quarter zlaty.
No one of those mentioned can sell and brew beer. At all times, up to five commoners can sell beer at one time, with the exception of the annual market. In time of market, and time two weeks before and afterwards, every commoner have the right to sell wine and beer. Selling of beer, as is selling of wine, is passed from one to another. If any commoner had brewed beer, during the inspection by mayor and burgesses would decide on an amount of malt spent for manufacture for one zlaty and depending on this an amount of first class beer, for which one zlaty is paid is set, so that the one who brewed the beer will have his money back. For the selling of first class beer one quarter of zlaty goes to town. Second class beer should be sold for a lesser price, the lowest quality beer can be brewed for one's own purposes. Anytime one boils beer, two water cans should be brought to the teachers at school. If anyone cannot brew beer, the right of order might be sold for quarter zlaty. No one can sell either wine or beer on loan.
When a butcher kills livestock, the mayor and two members of burgesses should assure that it will be killed and processed according to the rules of this craft. After it is killed, the intestines must be taken out and the skin taken off. It should be divided from its head and legs. Only after this, can its weight be measured. When the price for one pound is decided, the mayor and assembly members have the right to take the intestines. The tongue should be left for school children. If someone does not want to give up the tongue meat, the amount of its price must be given to the school.
No one can borrow money from the town's budget; neither the money can be spent by burgesses. Money should be each year accumulated so that the town has every time some money left, because one sixth of this money goes to people that the town should honor. (Noble man, landlord). If those who have the right to manage the town's money will spend more than one sixth of the budget, they should be deprived of confidence and dignity. They should be also physically punished as thieves. If anyone wants to invest some money of the town's budget, the mayor should agree, but with good guarantee and condition, that money will return in a year, with something from the income. Everything must be settled openly under the supervision of the mayor and burgesses.
No one can play dice from commoner and burgesses, with the exception of the landlord's servants, and nobles billeted in the town.
Bather, who knew how to do bloodletting (Physicians in the Middle Ages believed that most human illnesses were the result of excess fluid in the body (called humour). The cure was removing excess fluid by taking large amounts of blood out of the body. Two of the main methods of bloodletting were leeching and venesection.), has to pay annual tax of one zlaty for baths. For one bloodletting he was to be given four denar (zlaty had 100 denars), for one venesection (direct opening of vein) he should be given one Vienna denar, for one bathing one denar, and for bathing of a woman one obulus. Each family living in the town has to give one cart-load of logs. Afterwards, they would gain free access to bathe for a whole year. If anything is damaged in the bath, the town would pay for restoration.
Each person living in the town has to help for four days a year with hardening of the bank of the river Vah (Vág), so that it would not flood the town.
It is appointed that none of the citizens make an appeal to the court in Krupina (Korpona) (there was a court to which anyone from inhabitants of either Bystrica or Žilina (Zsolna) could take appeal), with the exception of death penalties and cases connected with persons dignity. In addition, no one should make an appeal if his case was not decided yet in the county with supervision of the landlord.
No one who lives on the field has to pay tax.
Anyone can bake bread, with condition that dough would have the same weight adequate for one denar.
Because anyone in Žilina (Zsolna) or in Rajec has the right to build frame for sprawling of the cloth. In addition, the inhabitants of Bystrica have the right to build it anywhere where it seems convenient to them.
Street of clothiers should be the one near the church. Residence of blacksmiths should be on the street leading from Moštenec, bootmakers should gather on the street leading from Hlinik. Because Bystrica has the same rights as Žilina (Zsolna) and Rajec, clothiers and the others may be grouped into guilds.
Those living on fields (lat. Inquilinus) must be able to serve the landlord for three days a year.
On the opposite side of the river no one can catch rabbits or birds.
People living in the town are allowed to catch fish with nets called sak and veter.
Those who live in Bystrica do not have to pay taxes to their landlord, with the exception of those who transport wine to Bytča (Nagybiccse) and Žilina (Zsolna). During the market no one pays any tax.
"King’s lunch" which the commoners had to give to the landlord, is no longer inevitable to be given to the landlord.
Manor Hrbotin is in possession of the town.
People from Bystrica from now on do not have to plough or do other works for the castle, with the exception of stacking wine bottles in the castle, mowing of meadows in Zakvasov, and works on repairing of the bridge.
Those living on the field should give only 10 denars, and nothing more to the town annually.

The landlord of Vágbeszterce (Považská Bystrica) has adopted the document and inhabitants of Bystrica have committed to keep these rules precisely. Those living on the fields have to give two dead roosters. If anyone does not respect these rules, especially those concerning wine and beer, that person would be deprived of dignity and could not become the member of burgesses. If anyone were to break the other rules, that person would have to pay half zlaty from which a half goes to the landlord and a half to the church.

References
Translation of the document as found in Považská Bystrica: Z dejín mesta or as found on http://slovenske-uhorsko.blogspot.com/2011/12/articuli-podmanickych-1506.html
http://www.povazska-bystrica.sk/historia-mesta.phtml?id3=2191

Land law
1506 in law
16th century in Hungary
1506 in Europe